For the school, see La Châtaigneraie (School)

La Châtaigneraie is a commune of the Vendée department in the Pays de la Loire region in western France.

It lies halfway between Nantes-Poitiers-Angers, about an hour from the beaches of Les Sables d'Olonne. Located on the sunny side of the Gatines hills, it is greatly attached to its past and values.

See also
Communes of the Vendée department

References

Communes of Vendée